The Yeti are fictional robots from the long-running British science fiction television series Doctor Who. They were originally created by Henry Lincoln and Mervyn Haisman, and first appeared in the 1967 serial The Abominable Snowmen, where they encountered the Second Doctor and his companions Jamie and Victoria.

The Yeti resemble the cryptozoological creatures also called the Yeti, with an appearance Radio Times has described as "cuddly but ferocious", disguising a small spherical device that provides its motive power. The Yeti serve the Great Intelligence, a disembodied entity from another dimension, which first appeared trying to form a physical body so as to conquer the Earth. Initially the Yeti are a ruse to scare off curiosity seekers, later serving as an army for the Great Intelligence.

Disagreements arose between Lincoln and Haisman with the BBC in 1968 over a serial introducing another new monster, The Dominators, leading to the writers' departure from the series and the retirement of the Yeti as antagonists. The Yeti have since appeared infrequently in flashbacks or cameo appearances. One did have a part in the 20th anniversary special The Five Doctors. They also appear in the 1990s Virgin Missing Adventures novels and the 1995 Reeltime spin-off production Downtime. The Great Intelligence has since returned in Series 7 of the revived series, portrayed by Sir Ian McKellen and Richard E Grant, without the aid of its Yeti servants.

Creation
The Yeti, along with contemporary villains such as the Cybermen and Ice Warriors, were an effort by the production team to create replacement monsters for the Daleks, who creator and part-copyright owner Terry Nation desired to have appear in an American spin-off series. The Evil of the Daleks, the last serial of the fourth season, had been intended as a final confrontation between the Doctor and the Daleks. Producer Innes Lloyd had already overseen the creation of the Cybermen by Gerry Davis and Kit Pedler and saw the monsters as an alternative to Daleks. Lloyd later recollected that the need to replace the Daleks also influenced the decision to pick up the Yeti as recurring monsters.

After Henry Lincoln and Mervyn Haisman had spoken with Patrick Troughton, who expressed disappointment in the lack of Earth-bound stories in his first season as the Doctor, Lincoln chose the stories of the yeti as a suitable concept around which to create a serial for the program. Lincoln and Haisman pitched the idea to the Doctor Who offices, where it was formally commissioned. Lloyd and script editor Peter Bryant were impressed with The Abominable Snowmen and commissioned Haisman and Lincoln for a second Yeti adventure.

Physical characteristics

Martin Baugh designed the Yeti costume; he was also responsible for costumes in their second serial The Web of Fear. This serial used different Yeti costumes from those of their debut, which were not considered threatening enough and had deteriorated. The Yeti robots that appear in The Abominable Snowmen are large with brown fur and a blackened face. These costumes also have clawed hands and feet, and they house control spheres in their chest, used by the Great Intelligence to remotely operate them.

These original costumes were deemed 'a little too cuddly' and so when the robots returned in The Web of Fear they were redesigned. These Yeti robots appeared more compact and had glowing eyes. Brian Hodgson of the BBC Radiophonic Workshop also developed a Yeti roar for this serial, created by slowing down the sound of a flushing toilet. One of the original Yeti from The Abominable Snowmen appeared briefly as a museum display and, upon being reactivated by a control sphere, transformed into the newer model.

In The Abominable Snowmen the control spheres are depicted as capable of seeking out inactive Yeti and crawling into the robots to activate them, emitting a series of whistle-like beeps whilst doing so. If the cavity intended to house the sphere is blocked, as Jamie (Frazer Hines) does with a rock, the sphere ignores that Yeti and falls silent. The Web of Fear expanded upon the spheres as a plot device with Professor Edward Travers and, as the serial progresses, the Doctor experimenting upon them. The experiments of both Travers and the Doctor eventually allow the protagonists to control the sphere, and by extension any Yeti it is stored within, using a short-range remote control.

History
The Yeti appeared twice in the fifth season of the series as adversaries of the Doctor's second incarnation (Patrick Troughton). They are introduced in the 1967 serial The Abominable Snowmen guarding a cave near a Buddhist monastery in the Himalayas, scaring or killing travellers. The Yeti robots are protecting a pyramid of spheres that house the Great Intelligence, who has also possessed the body of the High Lama Padmasamabhava (Wolfe Morris) ever since encountering the man on the astral plane some centuries ago. Using Padmasambhava the Great Intelligence moves small Yeti pieces around a chess-like map of the monastery and mountainside. The Great Intelligence intends to create a physical body for itself, but these plans are foiled by the Doctor and his companions. With the Intelligence banished back to the astral plane the Yeti fall dormant. Several Yeti curiosities are taken back to England by Travers (Jack Watling), who had come in the hopes of encountering the real Yeti.

In The Web of Fear, aired in 1968 and set forty years after The Abominable Snowmen, the Yeti artifacts that Travers brought to England reawaken due to the return of the Great Intelligence. The Yeti then subjugate London and engulf the Underground in web. The only resistance offered is by a band of soldiers, led first by Captain Knight (Ralph Watson) and then by Colonel Lethbridge-Stewart (Nicholas Courtney), with scientific support provided by Travers, his daughter Anne Travers (Tina Packer) and later the Doctor. The invasion of the London Underground is revealed as a trap designed to draw in the Doctor so that the Great Intelligence can drain the Doctor's mind, but it is again defeated and banished.

During the events of the Second Doctor's trial in the climax of season six's ten-part long The War Games, the Doctor refers to the Yeti as one of many threats that he has defeated during his travels. When in the 1983 serial Mawdryn Undead the Fifth Doctor encounters a retired and amnesiac Lethbridge-Stewart the Yeti are one of many references the Doctor makes to trigger the Brigadier's memory. Clips from The Web of Fear are also shown in a flashback montage during this serial. A Yeti is also one of the creatures featured in The Five Doctors and is encountered by the second Doctor and the Brigadier (Nicholas Courtney) as they cross through the Death Zone. The Brigadier later references the Yeti in the 1989 serial Battlefield as one of many alien adversaries that UNIT is prepared for. The Doctor's encounters with the Yeti are also referred to in the 2012 TV story "The Snowmen" when the Doctor uses a map of the 1960s London Underground to prove a point in front of a younger Great Intelligence, referencing its later invasion in 1968's The Web of Fear. The story also serves as a prequel to The Abominable Snowmen.

Other appearances
As a popular monster the Yeti have appeared in Doctor Who spin-off media; however, the canonical status of non-televised stories is uncertain. Yeti and the Great Intelligence are featured in the 1995 spin-off video Downtime, produced by Reeltime and featuring Victoria Waterfield (Deborah Watling), the Brigadier (Nicholas Courtney) and Sarah Jane Smith (Elisabeth Sladen) with a now deceased Professor Travers (Jack Watling) serving as a vessel for the Intelligence. Here the Great Intelligence plans on infecting the Internet so as to use it as a new body, using control spheres to transform humans into Yeti servants. Downtime was novelised by Marc Platt as part of Virgin's Missing Adventures range in 1996.

The Yeti also appear in the 1995 Missing Adventure Millennial Rites by Craig Hinton, where the summoning of a creature from the universe to come goes wrong and instead sees the Great Intelligence merged with that entity. This creates an altered London based on contradictory physical laws and populated by demons and sorcerers, forcing altered versions of the Sixth Doctor and his companion Mel (transformed into the Valeyard and a technomancer named Melaphyre) to restore London before the reality tears itself apart. The novel also features the character Anne Travers from The Web of Fear. Millennial Rites follows the New Adventure All-Consuming Fire by Andy Lane, published in 1994, in identifying the Great Intelligence with H. P. Lovecraft's Yog-Sothoth, a being from the universe before this one. The Great Intelligence also appeared in a back-up comic strip in Doctor Who Weekly #31–#34. Yeti robots were also among the monsters to appear in the 1997 video game Doctor Who: Destiny of the Doctors.

Reception and legacy

After the death of co-creator Mervyn Haisman, the Guardian's obituary called the Yeti his 'lasting legacy' to the series, noting how the monsters quickly found popularity among viewers. Their second appearance in The Web of Fear was considered such a success by the production team that the sixth season Cybermen serial The Invasion was intended as both a follow-up to the second Yeti adventure and a pilot for a new earthbound format for the series.  The Third Doctor Jon Pertwee is known for commenting that nothing frightened an audience more than "a Yeti on your loo in Tooting Bec" in reference to the success of the earthbound format, associating the creatures strongly with the new direction of the series.

Paul Cornell, commenting on Fortean themes within the series, mentions that Doctor Who is a populist series exploring the public perception of the fantastic and that the Yeti stories are an early example of Doctor Who exploring such concepts, which were later explored in several serials produced by Barry Letts in the early 1970s. Media historian James Chapman agrees that  The Abominable Snowmen is the first Doctor Who serial to explore cryptozoology or mythology with an alien grounding, also citing it as having drawn from the gothic horror atmosphere and plot of Hammer's 1957 film The Abominable Snowman. He reflects that their second outing, in The Web of Fear, turned what was merely another monster when in the Himalayas into a nightmare by placing them in the identifiable setting of the London Underground. Chapman concludes that The Web of Fear also, by centring the Yeti threat in the London Underground, is part of a horror tradition where a 'chaos world' is located under the surface the ordinary.

Graham Sleight commented that the voiceless Yeti robots, and similar monsters such as the Autons and the maggots in The Green Death, are controlled by another entity and are merely there to provide a threat, leading to the Yeti and similar monsters being less interesting than monsters that could talk or reason with the characters. In contrast, Fraser McAlpine and Nick Page felt that the Yeti being controlled gave them greater menace. McAlpine says this gives the Yeti menace because, being controlled, they can't hold any feelings or grudges of their own and act only as the fierce physical agents for whoever can control them. Page reflected that 'the Great Intelligence... always turned off their power when it was not required', creating suspense when characters interacted with a seemingly dormant Yeti.

See also
 Great Intelligence
 List of Doctor Who robots
 The Abominable Snowman
 Cthulhu Mythos in popular culture

References

Fictional robots
Doctor Who races
Television characters introduced in 1967
Fictional avatars
Fiction about monsters
Television episodes about robots
Yeti in fiction